Squalius ghigii, the Rhodes minnow,  is a species of freshwater fish in the family Cyprinidae, also known as the gizani or ghizáni. It is currently considered to be endemic to the island of Rhodes, Greece. Its natural habitats are rivers, intermittent rivers, freshwater marshes, freshwater springs, and water storage areas. It is threatened by habitat loss.

Some authors have included the species in the genus Ladigesocypris.

References

 
Gizani EU LIFE-Nature project page

Squalius
Cyprinid fish of Europe
Fauna of Greece
Fish described in 1927
Taxonomy articles created by Polbot
Taxobox binomials not recognized by IUCN